Ludwig Johannes Herbert Martin Münchmeyer (June 2, 1885, Hoel, Province of Hanover – July 24, 1947) was an Evangelical German pastor known for antisemitism. He led an "antisemitic spa" on the island of Borkum. He won a libel suit against Bruno Weil, but enough of the allegations of loose morals and scandalous misconduct against him were confirmed that he was defrocked. He later acted as a prominent Nazi speaker after leaving the German National People's Party. He also propagandized for the Nazi Party in Weser-Ems.

Biography
Ludwig Münchmeyer came from an old, Lower Saxonian family of pastors, which can be traced back to Heinrich Münchmeyer (around 1654–1728), a tax official in Einbeck. He was the son of Carl Hans Wilhelm Ludwig Münchmeyer and Henriette Friederike Adelgunde Münchmeyer, née Brakebusch. In Rinteln he attended the gymnasium.

He studied Protestant theology in Erlangen, Leipzig and Göttingen and took the second theological examination in March 1911. On 17 June of the same year he was ordained. He was first employed as a seafarer's pastor in Cardiff in Great Britain. In March 1915 he became a military chaplain. He then became a military hospital chaplain in Hannover.

References 

1885 births
1947 deaths
People from Melle, Germany
20th-century German Lutheran clergy
German National People's Party politicians
Nazi Party politicians
People from the Province of Hanover
History of East Frisia
Members of the Reichstag of the Weimar Republic
Members of the Reichstag of Nazi Germany